Kellie-Maree Gibson (born 9 June 1996) is an Australian rules footballer playing for West Coast in the AFL Women's competition. She was one of Adelaide's two marquee players in the inaugural AFL Women's season and has also played for Fremantle. A multi-sport athlete, Gibson began her athletic career as a sprinter, and won a gold medal in rugby sevens at the 2014 Summer Youth Olympics.

AFL Women's career
Gibson was selected to play in the first AFL-sanctioned women's exhibition match in 2013, when she was barely 17. Over the following years, she played women's AFL exhibition games for both the Western Bulldogs and Melbourne Football Club.

Gibson was one of two marquee player signings announced by Adelaide in July 2016, in anticipation of the 2017 AFL Women's season. After playing in all seven regular season games and the 2017 AFL Women's Grand Final with the premiership-winning team, Gibson expressed a desire to return to Western Australia. Unable to negotiate a trade with Fremantle, Adelaide delisted her on in May 2017. At the start of the free agency period, Fremantle signed Gibson for the 2018 AFL Women's season.

Gibson sustained a hip flexor injury in a practice match before the beginning of the 2018 AFL Women's season. An initial diagnoses suggested a six-to-eight week recovery time. She made her debut for Fremantle in the final round of the 2018 season, kicking a goal as Fremantle defeated Carlton at Fremantle Oval.

In April 2019, Gibson joining cross-town rivals West Coast for their inaugural season.

Statistics
 Statistics are correct to the end of the 2017 season

|- style="background-color: #EAEAEA"
! scope="row" style="text-align:center" | 2017
|
| 2 || 8 || 4 || 2 || 38 || 16 || 54 || 9 || 11 || 0.5 || 0.3 || 4.8 || 2.0 || 6.8 || 1.1 || 1.4
|- class="sortbottom"
! colspan=3| Career
! 8
! 4
! 2
! 38
! 16
! 54
! 9
! 11
! 0.5
! 0.3
! 4.8
! 2.0
! 6.0
! 1.1
! 1.4
|}

Personal life
Prior to being selected by Adelaide as a marquee player, Gibson moved from Perth to Adelaide in June 2016 to work for the South Australian National Football League (SANFL) as female engagement coordinator.

References

External links

Living people
1996 births
Adelaide Football Club (AFLW) players
Australian rules footballers from Western Australia
Rugby sevens players at the 2014 Summer Youth Olympics
Fremantle Football Club (AFLW) players
West Coast Eagles (AFLW) players
Youth Olympic gold medalists for Australia